Macmillan's thicket rat (Grammomys macmillani) is a species of rodent in the family Muridae. It is found in Central African Republic, Democratic Republic of the Congo, Ethiopia, Kenya, South Sudan, Tanzania, and Uganda. Its natural habitats are subtropical or tropical moist lowland forest, subtropical or tropical swamps, subtropical or tropical seasonally wet or flooded lowland grassland, shrub-dominated wetlands, and urban areas.

References
 Dieterlen, F. 2004.  Grammomys macmillani.   2006 IUCN Red List of Threatened Species.   Downloaded on 19 July 2007.

Grammomys
Rodents of Africa
Mammals described in 1907
Taxonomy articles created by Polbot